The 2007 Kobalt Tools 500 was the fourth stock car race of the 2007 NASCAR Nextel Cup Series and the 48th iteration of the event. The race was held on Sunday, March 11, 2007, before an audience of 105,000 in Hampton, Georgia at Atlanta Motor Speedway, a  permanent asphalt quad-oval intermediate speedway. The race took the scheduled 325 laps to complete. In the final laps of the race, Hendrick Motorsports driver Jimmie Johnson would make a late-race charge for the lead, completing a final pass for the lead with three laps left in the race to take his 25th career NASCAR Nextel Cup Series victory, his second victory of the season, and his second consecutive victory. To fill out the top three, Joe Gibbs Racing driver Tony Stewart and Roush Racing driver Matt Kenseth would finish second and third, respectively.

Background 

Atlanta Motor Speedway (formerly Atlanta International Raceway) is a track in Hampton, Georgia, 20 miles (32 km) south of Atlanta. It is a 1.54-mile (2.48 km) quad-oval track with a seating capacity of 111,000. It opened in 1960 as a 1.5-mile (2.4 km) standard oval. In 1994, 46 condominiums were built over the northeastern side of the track. In 1997, to standardize the track with Speedway Motorsports' other two 1.5-mile (2.4 km) ovals, the entire track was almost completely rebuilt. The frontstretch and backstretch were swapped, and the configuration of the track was changed from oval to quad-oval. The project made the track one of the fastest on the NASCAR circuit.

Entry list 

 (R) denotes rookie driver.

Practice

First practice 
The first practice session was held on Friday, March 16, at 3:30 PM EST. The session would last for one hour and 30 minutes.

Second practice 
The second practice session was held on Saturday, March 17, at 10:00 AM EST. The session would last for 50 minutes. Jimmie Johnson, driving for Hendrick Motorsports, would set the fastest time in the session, with a lap of 29.297 and an average speed of

Final practice 
The final practice session, sometimes referred to as Happy Hour, was held on Saturday, March 17, at 1:20 PM EST. The session would last for one hour.

Qualifying
Qualifying was held on Friday, March 9, at 6:10 PM EST. Each driver would have two laps to set a fastest time; the fastest of the two would count as their official qualifying lap. While positions 1-42 would be determined by qualifying speed, the top 35 teams in owner's points would be assured that they would earn a spot in the field if they had managed to make an effort to qualify.  The remaining seven positions from positions 36-42 would be assigned to those drivers with the fastest qualifying speeds whose car owners are not among the top 35. The final starting position, position 43, can be utilized by a car owner whose driver is a current or past NASCAR Nextel Cup champion who participated as a driver during the current of previous season and was entered in the event for that owner in that car prior to the entry deadline. In the case that iff there was more than one series champion vying for the position, it would be given to the most recent series champion. If the final provisional starting position is not filled by a current or past series champion, it will be assigned to the next eligible car owner according to qualifying results.

Eight drivers would fail to qualify.

Full qualifying results

Race results

Standings after the race 

Drivers' Championship standings

Note: Only the first 12 positions are included for the driver standings.

References

Kobalt Tools 500
Kobalt Tools 500
NASCAR races at Atlanta Motor Speedway
March 2007 sports events in the United States